Alexander Andreevich Petrov (born 25 January 1989) is a Russian actor, known for his roles in Attraction (2017) and Gogol. The Beginning (2017).

Early life
Was born in Pereslavl-Zalessky, Yaroslavl Oblast, Russian SFSR, Soviet Union (now Russia).

He loved football since childhood, and at the age of 9 was admitted into the children's section of the local football club. His sporting successes were significant, and at the age of fifteen he was invited to train in Moscow. He was already preparing to leave when he became seriously injured - a mountain of bricks collapsed on him during school summer practice. He received a severe concussion, after which doctors prohibited him from sports.

After school he entered the economic department of the University of Pereslavl at the Institute of Program Systems of the Russian Academy of Sciences. However, he soon realized that this was not for him - when he began to participate in the student team of the KVN and the performances of the theatre (also student) "Entreprise".

During the theatrical festival, he took part in the master classes of teachers of the Russian Institute of Theatre Arts - GITIS and made his final choice. 
In 2008 he left the university and went to Moscow. From his first attempt he managed to enter the GITIS for the directing department in the workshop of L. Kheifets.

In 2012-2013, Alexander served in the Moscow Theatre "Et Cetera".
Based on the results of diploma theatricals, he received an offer from Aleksandr Kalyagin about enrollment in the troupe of the Moscow theatre "Et Cetera". He played Graziano in "Shylock" based on William Shakespeare's play "The Venetian Merchant", directed by Robert Sturua.

In 2013 he was admitted to the troupe of the Yermolova Theatre, under the leadership of Oleg Menshikov.
In the Yermolova Theatre, he played Hamlet in William Shakespeare's tragedy, directed by Valeriy Sarkisov.

Acting career

Petrov made his debut in 2010 in an episodic role of the television series Voices. In 2012, he played a major role in the series While the fern is blooming.

In the 2015 crime drama serial The Method produced by Alexander Tsekalo's Sreda, Petrov played the supporting role of police officer Zhenya. In the same year he also acted in the TV series Fartsa, by the same production company, this time in the lead role. The series is about Fartsovka — the illegal acquisition of consumer goods and currency from foreigners during the Soviet Union. He played Andrei Trofimov, an aspiring writer. In 2017, he acted in Sreda's feature film — Gogol. The Beginning. In this horror-fantasy picture, loosely based on Evenings on a Farm Near Dikanka, he portrayed writer Nikolai Gogol.

He played one of the main roles in the disaster-film Attraction (2017) by Fyodor Bondarchuk. According to the plot of the film; over the city there is an unidentified object, which later, for the safety of citizens, is shot down. Only when it falls to the ground do experts find that this object is of unearthly origin.

In 2018 he acted in the musical romantic drama about figure skating, Ice.

Film news and database website Kinopoisk named Alexander Petrov as the most popular Russian actor of 2017.

He again played the role of Artyom in Invasion, the sequel of Attraction in 2020.

Filmography

Film

Television

References

External links

 
 

1989 births
Living people
People from Pereslavl-Zalessky
Russian male film actors
Russian male television actors
Russian male stage actors
21st-century Russian male actors
Russian male voice actors
Male actors from Moscow
Russian Academy of Theatre Arts alumni